Constitutional Assembly elections were held in Paraguay on 6 February 1977. The Colorado Party was the only party to contest the elections amidst an opposition boycott, and won all seats. Voter turnout was 82.8%. Following the election, the constitution was amended to scrap term limits, allowing President Alfredo Stroessner to contest the 1978 elections.

Results

References

Paraguay
1977 in Paraguay
Elections in Paraguay
One-party elections
Alfredo Stroessner
February 1977 events in South America
Election and referendum articles with incomplete results